Mapperley Methodist Church is an active Methodist church on Woodborough Road in Mapperley, Nottingham.

History
The building of the church started in 1903 to designs by local architect Albert Edward Lambert. The congregation occupied the building for the first time in October 1904. It cost around £3,191.

The church underwent a major restoration in 2009 including the provision of a lift, toilets for disabled people, new kitchen facilities and hearing induction loop at a cost of £154,000.

References

External links
 Mapperley Methodist Church Website
 Mapperley Methodist Church Facebook Page

Methodist churches in Nottingham
Churches completed in 1904
Gothic Revival church buildings in England
Gothic Revival architecture in Nottinghamshire
Albert Edward Lambert buildings